Phaneroptera falcata, the sickle-bearing bush-cricket, is a species of Orthopterans belonging to the subfamily Phaneropterinae. It is herbivorous and commonly measures 24 to 36 mm long. It lives mainly in very warm scrub and grasslands areas,
also on dry shrubbery and in sand pits and gardens.

Distribution
Phaneroptera falcata occurs in central and southern Europe, with 
the northern distribution limit about Cologne. But they are absent in the Alpine foothills and in many parts of the Swabian Alps. Phaneroptera falcata has been extending the northern limits of its range in mainland Europe in recent decades. Vagrant adults are occasionally found in Britain, and a small, but apparently established, colony was discovered near Dungeness in Kent in 2015.

References

External links
Sound recordings of Phaneroptera falcata on BioAcoustica

Phaneropterinae
Insects described in 1761
Orthoptera of Europe
Taxa named by Nikolaus Poda von Neuhaus